Rainbow Glacier is in Glacier National Park in the U.S. state of Montana. Rainbow Glacier has shown modest retreat compared to other glaciers in Glacier National Park, and lost just over 9 percent of its surface area between 1966 and 2005.

References

See also
 List of glaciers in the United States
 Glaciers in Glacier National Park (U.S.)

Glaciers of Flathead County, Montana
Glaciers of Glacier National Park (U.S.)
Glaciers of Montana